Ponni may refer to:
Ponni rice, a variety of rice cultivated in India
Ponni (novel), a 1967 Malayalam novel by Malayattoor
Ponni (1976 film), a film based on the novel
 Ponni (1953 film), a Tamil film
 Ponni, another name for Kaveri River